Kochi Dam is an earthfill dam located in Yamaguchi prefecture in Japan. The dam is used for irrigation. The catchment area of the dam is 0.8 km2. The dam impounds about 3  ha of land when full and can store 204 thousand cubic meters of water. The construction of the dam was completed in 1925.

References

Dams in Yamaguchi Prefecture
1925 establishments in Japan